No Depression is the first studio album by alternative country band Uncle Tupelo, released in June 1990. After its formation in the late 1980s, Uncle Tupelo recorded the Not Forever, Just for Now demo tape, which received a positive review by the College Media Journal in 1989. The review led to the band's signing with what would become Rockville Records later that year. The album was recorded with producers Sean Slade and Paul Q. Kolderie at Fort Apache Studios, on a budget of US$3,500.

No Depression was critically acclaimed and sold well for an independent release. Selling over 15,000 copies within a year of its release, the album's success inspired the roots music magazine No Depression. The record is considered one of the most important alternative country albums, and its title is often used as a synonym for the alternative country genre after being popularized by No Depression magazine. After regaining the rights to the album through a lawsuit, Uncle Tupelo released a remastered version in 2003 through Legacy Records, expanded to include six bonus tracks.

Background 
Jay Farrar, Jeff Tweedy and Mike Heidorn began their musical careers in the 1980s playing in a garage band, The Plebes. After a few gigs, creative differences between the members led to the development of a punk rock sound for the band. As punk rock was unpopular in the St. Louis region, the band changed their style to blues-rock and renamed themselves Uncle Tupelo. At this point, they stopped performing covers and began to write their own songs.

The band discovered a musical niche around Washington University in St. Louis, where bands such as Brian Henneman's Chicken Truck performed in a similar style. The trio recorded its first professional tracks in Champaign, Illinois with future Chicago punk producer Matt Allison. The demo tape, Not Forever, Just for Now, contained early versions of several songs that would later appear on their debut album, including "Train", "Whiskey Bottle", "Flatness", "Screen Door", and "Before I Break".

That demo, as well as the band's rigorous touring schedule, attracted the attention of several music scouts. Record labels initially were wary of signing the band whom they perceived as straddling "the divide between the countrified punk of early 1980s such as Green on Red, Jason & the Scorchers, and X—none of whom had bum-rushed the charts—and the Pacific Northwest grunge of Mudhoney and Nirvana, which was still years from breaking out commercially". However, the influential CMJ New Music Report gave the demo tape a favorable review in 1989, praising its "mature, developed, seriously thought-out songwriting". This review prompted New York City-based distributor Dutch East India Trading to provide funding for the band to record an album on their Giant Records label, shortly before the label was renamed to Rockville Records.

Recording 

Six months before signing a full contract with Giant/Rockville, Uncle Tupelo recorded the tracks for No Depression over ten days in January 1990 at Fort Apache South, a musician-run studio in the Roxbury neighborhood of Boston, Massachusetts. As the trio could not afford the cost of recording at a twenty-four track studio in nearby Cambridge, they settled on the cheaper Fort Apache studio. The album cost US$3,500 to produce, $1,000 of which went to in-house producers Sean Slade and Paul Q. Kolderie. The band was interested in working with Slade and Kolderie after hearing their production of Dinosaur Jr.'s album Bug. The producers allowed Farrar to use the same 1961 Gibson Les Paul guitar that J. Mascis used on Bug, which gave the power chords on No Depression a richer tone.

Slade and Kolderie suggested that the band deemphasize the roots rock influences heard on Not Forever, Just for Now and convinced them to replace the harmonica parts with pedal steel guitar. For this, Slade and Kolderie recruited guitarist Rich Gilbert of Human Sexual Response for the recording. The tracks were recorded using little overdubbing; only a few banjo and acoustic guitar parts were later added to the songs. At the suggestion of Slade and Kolderie, No Depression was recorded on eight-track, so "the music would compress and "jump" off the tape during playback". The recording sessions occurred before Uncle Tupelo officially became affiliated with Giant Records, so there was little input from the label.

Lyrically the songs reflected the band members' experiences growing up in Belleville. Farrar and Tweedy romanticized tales about unemployment, alcoholism, and the feeling of living in a small town in an effort to emulate the profundity of songwriters such as Woody Guthrie. Musically, No Depression was influenced by the start-stop musical pattern of the Minutemen. The cover of the album features a blurry photo of the band, taken by J. Hamilton, reminiscent of the albums released on Folkways Records.

Promotion and reception 

No Depression was released by Rockville Records on June 21, 1990. The promotional tour for the album began at Cicero's Basement, a St. Louis bar associated with Washington University. The tour took Uncle Tupelo to both the East Coast and the Southwestern United States. Missouri radio stations KDHX and KCOU frequently played tracks off the album. By March 1991, No Depression had sold over 15,000 units, a hit by independent record standards. The proceeds from the album recuperated the $3,500 cost of the album, but Rockville refused to pay the band any royalties. Farrar and Tweedy later successfully sued Rockville CEO Barry Tenenbaum to attain the royalties. The surprise success of the album prompted Columbia Records to pay the band to record additional tracks with Slade and Kolderie at Fort Apache Studio in the summer of 1990, but the results were not released. Rolling Stone did not publish a review of the album upon its initial release, although the magazine later featured Uncle Tupelo in an article about rising stars alongside The Black Crowes. Rolling Stone later called the album "one of the loudest, loneliest wails in recent memory to arise from the Midwest's recession-plagued plains". Robert Christgau dismissed the album as a "dud".

After the lawsuit with Tenenbaum, Farrar and Tweedy received the rights to their first three albums (including No Depression), which were previously held by Rockville. In 2003, Uncle Tupelo remastered and re-released No Depression with six bonus tracks through Legacy Records, a Sony Music label. Among the bonus tracks were cover versions of the Flying Burrito Brothers' "Sin City", the Carter Family's "Blues Die Hard", and The Vertebrats' "Left in the Dark". The liner notes for the re-release featured an article written by Mike Heidorn about Uncle Tupelo's early days and the creation of No Depression. Upon re-release, AllMusic referred to the album as "Uncle Tupelo's landmark opening salvo", praising its "undeniable electricity" and remarking that it brought "new life" to the fusion of country and punk rock. Rolling Stone critic Tom Moon lauded "the band's impressive songwriting range", but noted that the bonus material was "pleasant but inconsequential". Pitchfork gave the re-issue an 8.4 rating out of 10, proclaiming "No Depression is a significant record".

No Depression is cited by RealNetworks as one of the most important albums in the alternative country genre. This was partly due to the success of the alternative country periodical No Depression, which took its name partly from the album. Due to the impact of the album on alternative country, "No Depression" is sometimes used as a synonym for the genre. AllMusic critic Jason Ankeny noted that the album helped the band "kick-start a revolution which reverberated throughout the American underground". In 1999, Spin listed the album at #63 in their rankings of the "Top 90 Albums of the 90s".

Track listing

Original release

All songs written by Jay Farrar, Jeff Tweedy, and Mike Heidorn except as indicated.

2014 Legacy Edition

 Tracks 1-10 from 1989 demo tape "Not Forever, Just for Now", tracks 11-12 from 1988 demo tape "Live & Otherwise", and tracks 13-17 from 1987 demo tape "Colorblind and Rhymeless".

Personnel 
Uncle Tupelo
 Jay Farrar – vocals, guitar, banjo, mandolin, fiddle, harmonica
 Mike Heidorn – drums, cymbals
 Jeff Tweedy – vocals, acoustic guitar, bass guitar

Additional personnel
 Rich Gilbert – pedal steel guitar
 J. Hamilton – photography
 Paul Q. Kolderie – production, audio engineering, sound effects
 Sean Slade – production, piano, engineering, background vocals

Notes

External links 
 No Depression liner notes (2003 reissue) from factorybelt.net

1990 debut albums
Albums produced by Paul Q. Kolderie
Albums produced by Sean Slade
Uncle Tupelo albums
Dutch East India Trading albums